The Marimbona river is located in northern Madagascar and crosses the Route Nationale 5 near Soanierana Ivongo.
It has its springs near Andilamena (Alaotra Mangoro), forms the southern border of the Ambatovaky Reserve, passes Andapafito and flows into the Indian Ocean north of Soanierana Ivongo.

References 

Rivers of Madagascar
Rivers of Analanjirofo
 Rivers of Alaotra-Mangoro